Maan or Ma'an may refer to:

Places
 Ma'an, a city in Jordan, and capital of the governorate
 Ma'an Governorate, a governorate of Jordan
 Ma'an, Syria, a village near Hama
 Maan, Punjab, a village Kasur District, Punjab, Pakistan
 Ma'an, Cameroon, a commune in Cameroon
 Man, Vikramgad, a village in Maharashtra, India
 Ma'an, Huitong (马鞍镇), a town of Huitong County, Hunan.

People
 Maan (surname)
 Maan (singer) (born 1997), Dutch singer and actress

Entertainment
 Maan (film), a 1954 Bollywood film
 Maan (Indian TV series), a 2001–2002 Indian soap opera television series that aired on Metro Gold
 Maan (Pakistani TV series), a 2015–2016 Pakistani television drama series that aired on Hum TV

Other uses
 Maan family, a medieval Druze princely family
 Ma'an News Agency, a Palestinian news agency
 Arab Democratic Party (Israel)